Jürgen Schult (born 11 May 1960) is a German former track and field athlete and, as of September 2021, the world record holder in the discus. Dating from 1986, this is the longest-standing record in men's track and field. Schult represented East Germany in the 1988 Olympic discus competition, where he won the gold medal.

Biography

Born in Amt Neuhaus, now in Niedersachsen, Schult was unable to compete in the 1984 Summer Olympics in Los Angeles due to his country's boycott of the games.

He set a world record in the discus in 1986. This discus world record still stands today and is the longest-standing men's world record ever (having surpassed the length of Jesse Owens' long jump record, which stood for 25 years and 79 days).

In 1988, at the first ever track and field competition between East and West Germany, Schult refused to shake hands with his former teammate, Wolfgang Schmidt, after beating him; Schmidt had very shortly before moved from East to West Germany.

Later in his long sports career, Schult joined the reunified German team. He competed in a second Olympic Games in 1992, getting a silver medal, and the 1999 World Championships, again getting second place. He competed in his final Olympics in 2000 at the age of 40, finishing in eighth place.

Schult has a degree in sport, and in 2002 became the trainer of the German track and field association's men's discus team.

Schult represented the Traktor Schwerin sports club and trained with Dr. Hermann Brandt, later he represented the Schwerin and Riesa sports clubs and trained with Thomas Schult. While he was actively competing, he was 1.93 meters tall and weighed 110 kilograms.

International competitions
1979 European Athletics Junior Championships: 1st place
1983 World Championships in Athletics: 5th place (64.92)
1986 European Athletics Championships: 7th Place (64.38)
1987 World Championships in Athletics: 1st place (68.74)
1988 Olympic Games: 1st place (68.82)
1990 European Athletics Championships: 1st place (64.58)
1991 World Championships in Athletics: 6th place (63.12)
1992 Olympic Games: 2nd place (64.94)
1993 World Championships in Athletics: 3rd place (66.12)
1994 European Athletics Championships: 3rd place
1995 World Championships in Athletics: 5th place (64.44)
1996 Olympic Games: 6th place
1997 World Championships in Athletics: 3rd place (66.14)
1998 European Athletics Championships: 2nd place
1999 World Championships in Athletics: 2nd place (68.18)
2000 Olympic Games: 8th place (64.41)

References

Track and Field News

External links 
Video of world record

1960 births
Living people
People from Lüneburg (district)
Sportspeople from Lower Saxony
East German male discus throwers
German male discus throwers
German athletics coaches
Olympic athletes of East Germany
Olympic athletes of Germany
Olympic gold medalists for East Germany
Olympic silver medalists for Germany
Athletes (track and field) at the 1988 Summer Olympics
Athletes (track and field) at the 1992 Summer Olympics
Athletes (track and field) at the 1996 Summer Olympics
Athletes (track and field) at the 2000 Summer Olympics
World Athletics Championships athletes for East Germany
World Athletics Championships athletes for Germany
World Athletics Championships medalists
European Athletics Championships medalists
World Athletics record holders
Medalists at the 1992 Summer Olympics
Medalists at the 1988 Summer Olympics
Olympic gold medalists in athletics (track and field)
Olympic silver medalists in athletics (track and field)
World Athletics Championships winners
Friendship Games medalists in athletics